Rarity may refer to:

Concepts 
Economic rarity, or scarcity, the economic problem of human want exceeding limited resources
Species rarity, the position of species organisms being very uncommon or infrequently encountered

People 
John Rarity, an English physicist

Fictional characters 
 Rarity, a character in My Little Pony Crystal Princess: The Runaway Rainbow
 Rarity, a character in My Little Pony: Friendship Is Magic

Music 
 Rarity (band), a Canadian rock band

See also 
Rarities (disambiguation)
Rare (disambiguation)